Henryk Tomaszewski aka Heinrich Karl Koenig (1919–2001) was a mime artist and theatre director, born in Poznań, Poland. He settled in Cracow in 1945 to study theatre after the end of World War II during which he studied at Iwo Gall's Theatre Studio from 1945 to 1947 and ballet under Feliks Parnell.  Tomaszewski left Parnell's company in 1949 and resettled in Wrocław, where he worked as a ballet dancer in the Opera and already there began to develop his own concept of mime.

In 1956, Tomaszewski's Mime Studio had its premiere performance at the Polski Theatre in Wrocław. In 1958 the Mime Studio was renamed the Wroclaw Mime Theatre and was granted the status of State theatre in 1959.  Tomaszewski ceased performing in the mid-1960s but continued to direct, train, and choreograph the ensemble and all productions.

Tomaszewski's conceptions of mime technique are modern much in the same way as Etienne Decroux's or Jacques Lecoq's but developed along different lines owing to the differences in Polish and French theatre traditions. Little reference is made to commedia dell'arte traditions.

Notable students and members of his company include Stanisław Brzozowski, Ewa Czekalska, Leszek Czarnota, Danuta Kisiel-Drzewinska, Jerzy Kozlowski, Krystyna Marynowska, Stefan Niedzialkowski,  Janusz Pieczuro, Paweł Rouba, Andrzej Szczużewski, Zbigniew Papis, Czesław Bilski, Jerzy Reterski, Urszula Hasiej, Jerzy Stępniak, Krzysztof Szwaja, Marek Oleksy, Julian Hasiej, and Lucyna Stankiewicz.

Tomaszewski's early work is documented in English in "Tomaszewski's Mime Theatre" by Andrzej Hausbrandt (Poland: Interpress, 1975).

Between 1960 and 1966 he collaborated with the Służba Bezpieczeństwa (State Counterintelligence Service), reporting on the activities of his friends and colleagues. He did not receive payment for these activities, and Dr. Sebastian Ligarski, the researcher who discovered the dossier on Tomaszewski in the archives of the Wroclaw IPN (Institute of National Remembrance), conjectures that the service blackmailed him either because of his known homosexual tendencies or with the threat of a ban on foreign travel. The service believed that Tomaszewski, while traveling abroad with his colleagues in the Pantomime Theatre, might discover any contacts with foreign intelligence services.

Notes

External links
 Henryk Tomaszewski at Culture.pl

 Wroclaw Mime Theatre named after H Tomaszewski
 Jan Berski, "Going Around Words. A Conversation with Henryk Tomaszewski", Heksis 2/2010

1919 births
2001 deaths
Polish mimes
Polish male actors
Polish gay artists
People from Poznań
20th-century Polish LGBT people